A Aurora do Lima  is a Portuguese language newspaper founded on December 15, 1855.It is one of the oldest newspapers in Portugal.

References

External links 
 Official Aurora do Lima Website

Newspapers established in 1855
Portuguese-language newspapers
1855 establishments in Portugal